Preston Point (Niergarup in Noongar) is a small point in the Swan River, Western Australia. On the other side of the river is Rocky Bay and the suburbs of North Fremantle and Mosman Park.

It was named by Sir James Stirling in 1827 after Lieutenant William Preston.

Prior to European settlement, the area was known to the Noongar indigenous people as Niergarup, and was an important ceremonial and camping area.

References

Swan River (Western Australia)

Places of Noongar significance